Martina Boesler (later Kirchner and Wieduwilt, born 18 June 1957 in Berlin) is a German rower. She is the sister of Petra Boesler, who is also an Olympic rower. Their aunt, Renate Boesler, won several medals at European Rowing Championships.

References

External links
 

1957 births
Living people
People from East Berlin
Rowers from Berlin
East German female rowers
Olympic rowers of East Germany
Rowers at the 1980 Summer Olympics
Olympic gold medalists for East Germany
Olympic medalists in rowing
World Rowing Championships medalists for East Germany
Medalists at the 1980 Summer Olympics
Recipients of the Patriotic Order of Merit in silver